This page lists Japan-related articles with romanized titles beginning with the letter S. For names of people, please list by surname (i.e., "Tarō Yamada" should be listed under "Y", not "T"). Please also ignore particles (e.g. "a", "an", "the") when listing articles (i.e., "A City with No People" should be listed under "City").

S
S-VHS

Sa
Saaya Irie
Saba District, Yamaguchi
Sabae, Fukui
Saber Marionette
Sada, Shimane
Sadaharu Oh
Sadamitsu, Tokushima
Sado Province
Sado, Niigata
Sadowara, Miyazaki
Sae Isshiki
Saeki District, Hiroshima
Saeki, Okayama
SaGa
Saga District, Saga
Saga Prefecture
Saga, Kōchi
Saga, Saga
Sagae, Yamagata
Sagami Bay
Sagami Province
Saganoseki, Ōita
Sagamihara, Kanagawa
Sagara, Kumamoto
Sagara, Shizuoka
Issei Sagawa
Kenji Sahara
Sai, Aomori
Sai Shoki
Saibashi
Saichō
Saigawa, Fukuoka
Saigo, Miyazaki
Saigo, Shimane
Saigō Takamori
Saihaku District, Tottori
Saihaku, Tottori
Saijō, Ehime
Saijō, Hiroshima (Kamo)
Saijō, Hiroshima (Shōbara)
Saikaidō
Saiki, Ōita
Saikyō Line
Sailor Moon
Saint Seiya
Saionji Kinmochi
Saita, Kagawa
Saitama Prefecture
Saitama University
Saitama, Saitama
Saitama-Shintoshin Station
Saitō Dōsan
Saitō Hajime
Saitō Makoto
Morihiro Saito
Saitō Tatsuoki
Saito, Miyazaki
Saji, Tottori
Saka, Hiroshima
Sakabato
Sakado, Saitama
Hironobu Sakaguchi
Sakahogi, Gifu
Hiroyuki Sakai
Saburō Sakai
Toshihiko Sakai
Sakai, Osaka
Stan Sakai
Sakaide, Kagawa
Sakaiminato, Tottori
Sakamoto, Kumamoto
Kyu Sakamoto
Maaya Sakamoto
Sakamoto Ryōma
Ken Sakamura
Sakanoue no Tamuramaro
Sakashita, Gifu
Sakata, Yamagata
Sakata District, Shiga
Sakata Tōjūrō
Sakauchi, Gifu
Sakawa, Kōchi
Sake
Sakhalin
Sakishima Islands
Saku, Nagano
Saku, Nagano (Minamisaku)
Sakugi, Hiroshima
Sakuma Morimasa
Sakuma Shōzan
Sakuma, Shizuoka
Sakura
Sakura Wars
Sakura, Chiba
Motoi Sakuraba
Sakurae, Shimane
Sakura Gakuin
Sakurai, Nara
Sakurajima, Kagoshima
Sakuto, Okayama
Samebito
SameGame
Samukawa, Kanagawa
Samurai
Samurai I: Musashi Miyamoto
Samurai Shodown
Samurai Trilogy
Samurai-dokoro
Samus Aran
Sanada Masayuki
Sanada Yukimura
Sanagōchi, Tokushima
Sanda, Hyogo
Sand Land
Sango (InuYasha)
Sango, Nara
Sangokujin
Sangokushi
Sanjo, Niigata
Sanjuro
Sankei Shimbun
Sankei Sports
Sankō, Ōita
Sannan, Hyōgo
Sannomiya Station
Sano, Tochigi
Sanrio
Sansei
Santo, Hyogo
Santo, Shiga
Alessandro dos Santos
Sanuki Province
Sanuki, Kagawa
Sanwa, Hiroshima
Sanyo
San'yō Main Line
Sanyō Shinkansen
Sanyō, Okayama
Sanyo, Yamaguchi
Sanyō-Onoda, Yamaguchi
Sanyutei Encho
Sanzo Nosaka
Saori, Aichi
Sapporo Agricultural College
Sapporo Snow Festival
Sapporo
Sarin gas attack on the Tokyo subway
Sarubobo
Sasaguri, Fukuoka
Kazuhiro Sasaki
Sasaki Kojirō
Sasaki Mitsuzo
Sasayama, Hyogo
Sasebo, Nagasaki
Sashiki, Okinawa
Sashiko quilting
Sashimi
Sata, Kagoshima
Eisaku Satō
Junya Sato
Mikio Sato
Takuma Sato
Satori
Satosho, Okayama
Ernest M. Satow
Satsuma District, Kagoshima
Satsuma Province
Satsuma Rebellion
Satsuma, Kagoshima
Satsumasendai, Kagoshima
Satte, Saitama
Miyū Sawai
Tetsu Sawaki
Sawara, Chiba
Saya, Aichi
Sayama, Saitama
Sayo District, Hyogo
Sayo, Hyogo
Sayonara
Sazae-san

Sc
Scabbard
Sciadopitys
Schwarz Stein
Scout Association of Japan
s-CRY-ed

Sd
SDF-1 Macross

Se
Sea of Japan
Sea of Japan naming dispute
Sea of Okhotsk
Seal (Chinese)
Sealeo
Secondary education in Japan
Secret Life of Japan
Sefuri, Saga
Sega
Sega 32X
Sega Dreamcast
Sega Genesis
Sega Master System
Sega Mega Drive
Sega Meganet
Sega NAOMI
Sega Saturn
Segata Sanshiro
Sei Shōnagon
Seibu Lions
Seicho-No-Ie
Seidan, Hyogo
Seidō juku
Seidokaikan
Seifuku no jijitsu
Seiji Ozawa
Seijōgakuen-Mae Station
Seika, Kyoto
Seikan Tunnel
Seiken Densetsu
Seiko
Seinen
Seishin-Yamate Line
Seiwa, Kumamoto
Seiwa, Mie
Seiza
Seki, Gifu
Seki Takakazu
Tomokazu Seki
Seki, Mie
Sekigahara, Gifu
Sekigane, Tottori
Sekihan
Sekizen, Ehime
Seme
Sen no Rikyū
Senboku District, Osaka
Sencho, Kumamoto
Sendai, Miyagi
Sengoku period
Senkaku Islands
Sennan, Osaka
Sennan District, Osaka
Senryū
Sensei
Sentō
Seoul National University
Seppuku
Sera District, Hiroshima
Sera, Hiroshima
Seranishi, Hiroshima
Serial Experiments Lain
Sesshin
Sesshō and Kampaku
Sesshōmaru
Setagaya, Tokyo
Setaka, Fukuoka
Seto, Aichi
Seto Inland Sea
Seto Kaiba
Seto, Ehime
Seto, Okayama
Setoda, Hiroshima
Setouchi, Kagoshima
Setsubun
Settsu, Osaka
Settsu Province
Seven Lucky Gods
Seven Samurai

Sh
Shadow the Hedgehog
Shakkazombie
Shaku (ritual baton)
Shaku (unit)
Shakuhachi
Shaman King
Shamisen
Shamoji
Sharaku
Sharp Corporation
Sharp Zaurus
She, The Ultimate Weapon
Shenmue
Shiatsu
Shiba Inu
Ryotaro Shiba
Shibakawa, Shizuoka
Kitasato Shibasaburō
Shibata, Niigata
Shibata Katsuie
Shibetsu, Hokkaidō
Shibori
Shibukawa, Gunma
Shibushi, Kagoshima
Shibuya Station
Shibuya, Tokyo
Shichi Narabe
Shichi-Go-San
Shichijo, Kumamoto
Shida District, Shizuoka
Kijūrō Shidehara
Philipp Franz von Siebold
Shift JIS
Shiga District, Shiga
Naoya Shiga
Shiga Prefecture
Shiga, Shiga
Shigaraki, Shiga
Shigechiyo Izumi
Shigefumi Hino
Shigematsu Sakaibara
Mamoru Shigemitsu
Shigenobu, Ehime
Fusako Shigenobu
Shigeru Miyamoto
Shiiba, Miyazaki
Shiida, Fukuoka
Eihi Shiina
Ringo Shiina
Shiitake
Shijonawate, Osaka
Shikama District, Hyogo
Shikano, Tottori
Shikantaza
Shikatsu, Aichi
Shiki District, Nara
Shiki, Saitama
Shikken
Shikoku
Shima, Fukuoka
Shima, Mie
Shima District, Mie
Masatoshi Shima
Shima Province
Shimabara Rebellion
Shimabara, Nagasaki
Shimada, Shizuoka
Shimada Ichiro
Shimagahara, Mie
Shimajiri, Okinawa
Shimaki Kensaku
Shimamoto, Osaka
Shimane Prefecture
Shimane, Shimane
Shimano
Shimazaki Toson
Shime, Fukuoka
Shimizu Satomu
Takashi Shimizu
Shimizu Yoshinori
Shimizu, Shizuoka
Shimizu, Wakayama
Shimoda, Shizuoka
Shimodate, Ibaraki
Shimoge District, Ōita
Shimoichi, Nara
Shimoji, Okinawa
Shimokitayama, Nara
Shimomashiki District, Kumamoto
Yoko Shimomura
Shimonoseki, Yamaguchi
Shimotsu, Wakayama
Shimotsuke Province
Shimotsuma, Ibaraki
Shimōsa Province
Shimoyama, Aichi
Goro Shimura
Takashi Shimura

Sh (cont'd)
Shin Takahashi
Shin-Kobe Station
Shin Kokinshū
Shin-Ōsaka Station
Shinagawa Station
Shinagawa, Tokyo
Shinai
Shinano Province
Shinasahi, Shiga
Shozo Shimamoto
Shimbashi Station
Kaneto Shindo
Tsukihime, Lunar Legend
Shingo, Okayama
Shingon Buddhism
Shingū, Ehime
Shingu, Fukuoka
Shingu, Hyogo
Shingu, Wakayama
Shinichiro Watanabe
Shinidamachū
Shinji, Shimane
Shinjō, Yamagata
Shinjo, Okayama
Shinjo, Nara
Shinjuku ni-chōme, Tokyo
Shinjuku Station
Shinjuku, Tokyo
Makoto Shinkai
Shinkaichi Station
Shinkansen
Shinkawa, Aichi
ShinMaywa US-1
Shinminato, Toyama
Shinwa, Kumamoto
Shinobi (video game)
Masahiro Shinoda
Tetsuo Shinohara
Yoshio Shinozuka
Shinran
Shinsengumi
Shinshiro, Aichi
Shintaido
Shinto
Shinto music
Shintomi, Miyazaki
Shinyoshitomi, Fukuoka
Shiogama, Miyagi
Shiojiri, Nagano
Shionoe, Kagawa
Shiota, Saga
Shippo, Aichi
Shirahama, Wakayama
Shirakawa, Fukushima
Shirakawa, Gifu
Shiraki Shizu
Shirako
Shiranuhi, Kumamoto
Yuri Shiratori
Shiribeshi Subprefecture
Shiritori
Shiroi, Chiba
Shiroishi, Miyagi
Shiroishi, Saga
Shirokawa, Ehime
Shirone, Niigata
Masamune Shirow
Shishikui, Tokushima
Shiso
Shisui, Kumamoto
Shitara, Aichi
Shito ryu
Shitsuki District, Okayama
Shizuoka Prefecture
Shizuoka Shimbun
Shizuoka, Shizuoka
Shōbara, Hiroshima
Shōe
Shogi
Shogi variant
Shōgun
Shoboku, Okayama
Shodokan Aikido
Shōjo
Shokawa, Gifu
Shomuni
Shonai, Fukuoka
Shōnai, Ōita
Shonan
Shonan-Shinjuku Line
Shōnen
Shōnen-ai
Shonen Knife
Shōnen Sunday
Shoo, Okayama
Shōrin-ryū
Shorinji Kempo
Shotacon
Shotokan
Shōnen-ai
Shōwa period
Shōzu District, Kagawa
Shuchi District, Shizuoka
Shueisha
Shugo
Shuho, Yamaguchi
Shūnan, Yamaguchi
Shuntō
Shuriken
Shuriken-jutsu
Shūsō District, Ehime
Shuto, Yamaguchi
Shuto Expressway

Si
Siddham script
Siege of Inabayama Castle
Siege of Marune
Siege of Miki
Siege of Noda
Siege of Odani
Siege of Osaka
Siege of Ōtsu
Siege of Takamatsu
Siege of Terabe
Sieges of Nagashima
Siege of Takatenjin (1574)
Siege of Takatenjin (1581)
Silent Hill
The Silent Service
Sino-Japanese vocabulary
Sino-Japanese War (1894-1895)
Sino-Japanese War (1937-1945)
Sister Princess
Six best Waka poets

Sk
Skies of Arcadia
Sky Dream Fukuoka
Skymark Airlines

Sl
Slam Dunk (manga)
Slayers
Slime MoriMori Dragon Quest: Shougeki No Shippo Dan
Slow Step

Sm
SMAP

Sn
SNK Playmore
SNK vs. Capcom (series)

So
Sōran Bushi
Soba
Sōbu Main Line
Sobue, Aichi
Social Democratic Party (Japan)
Sodanyaku
Sodegaura, Chiba
Soeda, Fukuoka
Soekami District, Nara
SoftBank
SoftBank Mobile
Machiko Soga
Sohyo
Sōja, Okayama
Sōjōbō
Sōjutsu
Sōka Gakkai
Sōka University (Japan)
Soka, Saitama
Sokoban
Sokuhi Nyoitsu
Solid Snake
Sōma, Fukushima
Sōmen
Son of Godzilla
Son Gohan
Son Goku (Dragon Ball)
Son Goten
Soni, Nara
Sonic Advance 2
Sonic Adventure
Sonic Adventure 2
Sonic Crackers
Sonic Eraser
Sonic Heroes
Sonic Team
Sonic the Hedgehog
Sonic the Hedgehog (16-bit)
Sonic the Hedgehog (8-bit)
Sonic the Hedgehog 2 (16-bit)
Sonic the Hedgehog 2 (8-bit)
Sonic the Hedgehog 3
Sonic the Hedgehog CD
Sonic X
Sonnō jōi
Sonobe, Kyoto
Sony
Sony Ericsson
Soo District, Kagoshima
Sorachi Subprefecture
Soraku District, Kyoto
Sorcerous Stabber Orphen
Sōryō, Hiroshima
Sōtō
Soul Blazer
Soul Calibur
South Manchuria Railway
Southern All Stars
Southern Expeditionary Army Group
Soy sauce
Sōya Subprefecture
Soybean
Soyo, Kumamoto

Sp
Space Battleship Yamato
Space Channel 5
Space Invaders
Speed Racer
Spirited Away
Spitz (band)
Sports Hochi

Sq
Square Enix
Square Co.

St
Star Fox (series)
Starmie
Staryu
Steel Battalion
Stellvia of the Universe
Stephen K. Hayes
Strait of Tartary
Street Fighter
Street Fighter 2
Street Fighter II The Movie
Stroke order
Studio Ghibli

Su
Subaru
Subaru (telescope)
Subaru Impreza
Subaru Impreza WRX
Subaru Legacy
Subprefectures of Japan
Subprefectures in Hokkaidō
Issei Suda
Sue, Fukuoka
Sueyoshi, Kagoshima
Sugamo Prison
Sugawara no Takasue no musume
Sugi
Chiune Sugihara
Ken Sugimori
Suginami, Tokyo
Sugita Genpaku
Koichi Sugiyama
Sugoroku
Suica
Suihou Tagawa
Suikinkutsu
Suikoden
Suishō
Suita, Osaka
Suki, Miyazaki
Sukiyaki
Sukagawa, Fukushima
Suken
Sukumo, Kōchi
Sumida, Tokyo
Sumiyo, Kagoshima
Sumiyoshi Park
Sumo
Sumoto, Hyōgo
Sumoto, Kumamoto
Sunagawa, Hokkaidō
Sunomata, Gifu
Sunrise (company)
Sunto District, Shizuoka
Masayuki Suo
Suō Province
The Super Dimension Fortress Macross
The Super Dimension Fortress Macross: Do You Remember Love?
The Super Dimension Fortress Macross: Flash Back 2012
Super Famicom
Super Mario 64
Super Mario All-Stars
Super Mario Bros.
Super Mario Bros. 3
Super Mario RPG
Super Mario World
Super Mario World 2: Yoshi's Island
Super Mario World: Super Mario Advance 2
Super Metroid
Super Mushroom
Super Nintendo Entertainment System
Super Saiyan
Super Smash Bros. Melee
Super Sonic
Super Street Fighter 2 Turbo
Super-Kamiokande
Super deformed
Supreme Commander of the Allied Powers
Suribachi and surikogi
Surimi
Suruga Province
Susa, Yamaguchi
Susaki, Kōchi
Susami, Wakayama
Susanoo
Sushi
Susono, Shizuoka
Susuwatari
Suwa, Nagano
Suwa Province
Suzaka, Nagano
Suzakumon
Suzu
Suzaka, Nagano
Suzuka District, Mie
Suzuki
Ichiro Suzuki
Kantarō Suzuki
Suzuki method
Suzuki Miekichi
Seijun Suzuki
Shunryu Suzuki
Suzuki SV650
Yu Suzuki
Zenko Suzuki
Kenichi Suzumura

Sw
Sword

Sy
Syllabary

Sz
Sichuan pepper

S